"Embryo" (sometimes called "The Embryo") is a song by Pink Floyd. It was a concert staple in 1970–71, but a full band version was never released on any Pink Floyd studio album. A studio version did appear in 1970 on the rare multi-artist album Picnic – A Breath of Fresh Air.  Its next appearance was in 1983 on Pink Floyd's own compilation Works. It then appeared in 2007 on A Breath of Fresh Air – A Harvest Records Anthology 1969–1974 (one of only three tracks from the original sampler album to be included in the similarly-titled anthology). Multiple renditions of "Embryo" appeared on the band's 2016 box set The Early Years 1965–1972; two versions were also included on the smaller 2-disc compilation The Early Years 1967–1972: Cre/ation (2016).

History
The studio version of the song, recorded in 1968, is a quiet, almost acoustic piece sung by David Gilmour lasting less than five minutes. The song ends with a Farfisa organ, piano and Mellotron section and high-pitched vocal gibberish (with bassist Roger Waters having sped his voice up, much like he would later do on "Several Species of Small Furry Animals Gathered Together in a Cave and Grooving with a Pict"). This studio take has not appeared on any Pink Floyd album except Works, a US compilation. A short version, similar to the studio cut, was recorded live at a BBC session on 2 December 1968. "Embryo" was finally granted widespread release in the 2016–2017 Early Years box set. The set includes the original studio recording, the 1968 BBC live session, and other live performances from 1970 and 1971.

Live performances

The earliest known instance of Embryo played live was 18 January 1970, in Croydon. It was far longer than the studio take, lasting twelve minutes. It more closely resembled the studio take in arrangement, with Gilmour playing the acoustic rhythm part on electric guitar and Wright playing the piano and organ parts on the vibraphone. It closed with a reprise of the first verse.

The next recorded instance of the song being played was 11 February 1970, in Birmingham. By then it had reached the stage at which it would remain for the rest of its existence. It lasted a minimum of around 12 minutes but the jam section was often extended and the song could last up to around 25 minutes. Wright moved from the vibraphone back to the Hammond organ, Gilmour played a distinct lead part (making the arrangement less soft and more like a rock song), and as well as a reprise added a new section of music in the middle of the song. After the second verse Roger Waters opened up the jam section with a simple bass ostinato playing the blues scale. In lieu of Roger Waters' chirping on the studio version, a tape machine from the soundboard played a recording of children playing as the band continued to jam. Near the end of the section, David Gilmour created the famous "whalesong" effect (by reversing the cables on his wah pedal). This effect would appear much more prominently and famously in "Echoes", a year later.

On some occasions, for various reasons, the "children" tape was not played. This was usually replaced with Roger Waters making various squeaks and squeals into his reverberated vocal mic (similar to those in "Several Species of Small Furry Animals Gathered Together in a Cave and Grooving with a Pict").

"Embryo" was played in most shows from 18 January 1970, to 20 November 1971.

In 1971, after the addition of "Echoes" (or, as it was first called, "The Return of the Son of Nothing"), "The Embryo" lost the "whalesong" effect, as the "children" tape was filled with more jamming. At this stage, Rick Wright played a bluesy organ while David Gilmour produced a fair amount of processed background guitar textures with heavy use of volume pedal and effects created with the Binson Echo Unit the band often employed.

Including the early vibraphone-led Birmingham version, a handful of versions of The Embryo have appeared during the era in which it was played. One notable version played approximately three times began with another ten-minute improvised instrumental for which no title exists (it is often referred to as "The Librest Spacement Monitor"—a misinterpretation of Waters introducing "Mr. Nicholas Mason on the drums"), "Corrosion", or is assumed to be part of the jam section from "Interstellar Overdrive". On one occasion this was followed by a loud rant by Waters consisting of mostly-indistinguishable words in a thick Scottish accent (another element of "Several Species of Small Furry Animals Gathered Together in a Cave and Grooving with a Pict"). Only after this did a regular version of "Embryo" begin.

The last time "Embryo" was played was on 20 November 1971 at the conclusion of the band's North American tour. On this occasion, the middle jam-section was interrupted when Wright's Hammond suddenly failed, resulting in the remaining three members of the band continuing to jam for an extra fifteen minutes while waiting for the instrument to be repaired. This improvisation included elements of other Pink Floyd songs, most notably what appears to be an instrumental version of "Breathe" as well as the intro to "Raving and Drooling" (the 1974–75 precursor to "Sheep") and a rough "Any Colour You Like".

Release history
"Embryo" has been released on the following official releases:

 Picnic – A Breath of Fresh Air (1970) (demo version)
 Works (1983) (demo version)
 A Breath of Fresh Air – A Harvest Records Anthology 1969–1974 (2007) (demo version)
 The Early Years 1965–1972 (2016) (various renditions included in the box set's individual volumes)
 Volume 2: 1968 – Germin/ation (live recording, BBC Radio session 2 December 1968)
 Volume 3: 1969 – Dramatis/ation (demo version)
 Volume 4: 1970 – Devi/ation (several live versions: BBC Radio session 16 July 1970; Pop Deux Festival de St. Tropez, 8 August 1970; Roland Petit Ballet,  5 December 1970)
 Volume 5: 1971 – Reverber/ation (live recording, BBC Radio session 30 September 1971)
 The Early Years 1967–1972: Cre/ation (2016) (demo version; live recording, BBC Radio session, 16 July 1970)

Personnel
Studio version
David Gilmour – lead and backing vocals, acoustic guitar, electric guitar, wah wah pedal
Richard Wright – Hammond organ
Roger Waters – bass guitar, tape effects (sped-up gibberish)
Nick Mason – cymbals 

Live version
David Gilmour – co-lead vocals, electric guitar
Richard Wright – co-lead vocals, Hammond organ
Roger Waters – bass guitar
Nick Mason – drums

Cover versions
 A cover of the song, by German psychedelic/ Krautrock band Fantasyy Factoryy, appears on the 2001 compilation CD More Relics - A Tribute To Pink Floyd, issued by Sysyphus Records.
 German band RPWL recorded a cover for their album "RPWL plays Pink Floyd".

References

1968 songs
Pink Floyd songs
Songs written by Roger Waters